Melvin Robert Laird Sr. (August 7, 1878 – March 19, 1946) was an American politician, businessman and clergyman.

Born in Maysville, Illinois, Laird received his bachelor's degree from the University of Illinois, his masters from Princeton University, and his doctorate from Millikin University. He was a Presbyterian minister and educator. Laird served in the United States Army in World War I as a chaplain. He was also an office manager for the Connor Lumber and Land Company in Marshfield, Wisconsin. He served on the Wood County, Wisconsin, Board of Supervisors. He also served in the Wisconsin State Senate from 1941 until his death in 1946, as a Republican. He died in Rochester, Minnesota. His son, Melvin R. Laird, was elected in a special election to succeed his father.

Notes

1878 births
1946 deaths
People from Pike County, Illinois
People from Marshfield, Wisconsin
University of Illinois alumni
Princeton University alumni
Millikin University alumni
American Presbyterian ministers
Businesspeople from Wisconsin
County supervisors in Wisconsin
Republican Party Wisconsin state senators